Han Dekker (born 4 June 1913, date of death unknown) was a Dutch rower. He competed in the men's coxless four event at the 1948 Summer Olympics.

References

1913 births
Year of death missing
Dutch male rowers
Olympic rowers of the Netherlands
Rowers at the 1948 Summer Olympics
Sportspeople from Delft